Zheng Xiaoxu (Cheng Hsiao-hsu; ; Hepburn: Tei Kōsho) (2 April 1860 – 28 March 1938) was a Chinese statesman, diplomat and calligrapher. He served as the first Prime Minister of Manchukuo.

Early life and diplomatic career
Although Zheng traced his ancestral roots to Minhou, a small town near Fuzhou, Fujian, he was born in Suzhou, Jiangsu. In 1882, he obtained the intermediate degree in the imperial examinations, and three years later he joined the secretariat of the prominent statesman Li Hongzhang. In 1891, he was appointed secretary to the Chinese legation in Tokyo, and in the following years he performed consular duties at the Chinese consulates in Tsukiji, Osaka and Kobe respectively. During his tenure in Kobe, he worked closely with the Chinese community and played an instrumental part in establishing the Chinese guild (Zhōnghuá huìguǎn 中華會館) there. In Japan, Zheng also interacted with a number of influential politicians and scholars, such as Itō Hirobumi, Mutsu Munemitsu and Naitō Torajirō.

Government service
Following the outbreak of the First Sino-Japanese war in 1894, Zheng was forced to leave Japan. Having returned to China, Zheng joined the secretariat of the reformist statesman Zhang Zhidong in Nanjing and followed him to Beijing, where Zheng obtained a position in the Qing foreign office, the Zongli Yamen. Following the abortive Hundred Days' Reform in 1898, Zheng left his post in Beijing and took up a number of important government positions in central and southern China. After the collapse of the imperial system in 1911, Zheng remained loyal to the Qing dynasty and refused to serve under China's Republican government. Instead, he withdrew from public life entirely and retired comfortably in Shanghai, where he devoted his time to calligraphy, poetry and art, while also writing extensive articles critical of the Kuomintang leadership, whom he characterized as “thieves”.

Qing loyalist and collaboration with the Japanese
In 1923, the former Qing emperor Puyi summoned Zheng to Beijing in order to reorganize the imperial household. Zheng became a close adviser of Puyi and helped arrange for his flight to the foreign concession at Tianjin after his expulsion from the Forbidden City by general Feng Yuxiang. Zheng remained loyal to the throne and secretly met with Japanese officials and groups such as the Black Dragon Society to discuss a restoration of the Qing dynasty in Manchuria. Following the Mukden Incident and the invasion of Manchuria by the Imperial Japanese Army in 1931, Zheng played an important role in the establishment of Manchukuo, becoming its first prime minister the following year. Zheng also composed the lyrics of the National Anthem of Manchukuo. Zheng had hoped that Manchukuo would become a springboard for the restoration of Qing rule in the whole of China, but he soon found out that the real rulers of Manchukuo, the Japanese Kwantung Army, did not share his ambitions.

As Prime Minister of Manchukuo, Zheng frequently disagreed with the Japanese Army leadership. In May 1935, he was pressured to resign from his office. Three years later, he died suddenly under unclear circumstances, which led to speculation that he may have been poisoned by the Japanese. He was accorded a state funeral in April 1938.

Legacy
Although Zheng Xiaoxu is mostly remembered today for his collaboration with the Japanese, he is still recognized as an accomplished poet and calligrapher. Zheng was one of the most respected and influential calligraphers of the 20th century. His calligraphy brought high prices during his lifetime and he supported himself in later life with the proceeds from its sale. His calligraphy continues to be influential in China and his style has been incorporated into the logos of current Chinese corporations.

Zheng kept an extensive diary, which is still valued by historians as important source material.

Further reading
Aisin-Gioro Puyi (with assistance from Lao She). From Emperor to Citizen: The Autobiography of Aisin-Gioro Pu Yi. Translated by W.J.F. Jenner. Peking: Foreign Languages Press, 2002. .
Boorman, Howard L., Richard C. Howard, and Joseph K. H. Cheng, eds. Biographical Dictionary of Republican China. New York: Columbia University Press, 1967.
Kowallis, Jon Eugene von. The Subtle Revolution: Poets of the 'Old Schools' during late Qing and early Republican China. Berkeley: University of California, Institute of East Asian Studies, China Research Monographs #60, 2006. .

External links

 Calligraphy by Zheng Xiaoxu

1860 births
1938 deaths
Qing dynasty calligraphers
Chinese collaborators with Imperial Japan
Politicians from Suzhou
Government ministers of Manchukuo
Prime Ministers of Manchukuo
Qing dynasty politicians from Jiangsu
World War II political leaders
Republic of China calligraphers
Artists from Suzhou
Qing dynasty diplomats
Chinese anti-communists
Qing dynasty poets
Poets from Jiangsu
Bank of Communications people
Imperial tutors in Qing dynasty